PokerNews is a website dedicated to providing poker industry news, live tournament coverage, strategy, player interviews and videos, podcasts, and information on bonuses and freeroll tournaments available at online poker rooms. It is run by iBus Media, whose majority owner is The Stars Group Inc., a Canadian gaming and online gambling company traded on Nasdaq and the Toronto Stock Exchange and headquartered in Toronto.

Antanas "Tony G" Guoga, a Lithuanian-Australian businessman, founded the site in 2002. 
Guoga bought the domain name PokerNews.com for $6,000, hired a couple of programmers to set up the site, and began publishing articles. As of 2011, PokerNews offered native language sites in Germany, France, Netherlands, Italy, Russia, Poland, Australia, China, Portugal, Japan, Norway, and more.

Among PokerNews''' editors and writers were, as of 2014, Giovanni Angioni,  Jason Glatzer, Frank Op de Woerd, Mo Nuwwarah, Matthew Pitt, and Martin Harris.  PokerNews also employs contributors from various countries. In 2011, Sarah Grant was hired to host videos by PokerNews and PokerStars covering events all over the world.

History
In November 2005, PokerNews launched its UK edition.  In January 2006, the Swedish language site was launched.  In May 2006, another Scandinavian site launched as PokerNews Norway.  One month later, a Greek edition was added to the PokerNews global network.  The language expansion continued with the launch of a Danish language site in August 2006.  In January 2007, the site released a new edition written exclusively in Hebrew as PokerNews Israel.  Also that month, a Romanian language site called PokerNews Romania launched.  In April 2007, Czech Republic was launched as PokerNews Czech.  The Bulgarian version was launched in May 2007, followed by a Slovenian version.  In October 2007, the site's global reach expanded again with the addition of PokerNews Ukraine''.

In May 2007, PokerNews was named the exclusive Live Reporting Partner to World Series of Poker, replacing previous partner Card Player magazine. PokerNews produces and provides live play-by-play updates and chip counts for publication on the World Series of Poker website, as well as on PokerNews.com. The partnership has continued for over 7 years.

PokerNews has covered events all over the world including those on the European Poker Tour, Asia Pacific Poker Tour, Caribbean Poker Tour, World Poker Tour, Aussie Millions, Latin American Poker Tour, UK and Ireland Poker Tour, National Heads-Up Poker Championship, and the World Series of Poker.

On September 8, 2013, PokerNews' Head of Content Matthew Parvis conducted an exclusive interview with Howard Lederer that was released as a seven-part series titled, "Lederer Files". During the seven-hour interview, Lederer discussed the collapse of Full Tilt Poker, the board, the investors, Ray Bitar, Chris Ferguson, Phil Ivey, Black Friday, and more. Each episode was roughly 30 minutes in length.

In May 2013, PokerNews released the MyStack App, a mobile application for iPhone and Android that links poker players to the PokerNews live feed.  If a player is participating in a tournament that PokerNews is live reporting from, he or she can update his or her own chip counts, post comments, and share photos with other PokerNews readers from around the world. These player-generated updates link directly in to the PokerNews live reporting feed.

In 2013 through 2016, PokerNews was annually named Best Poker Affiliate by iGB Affiliate for its web traffic, innovation, and reputation with players, and brand power.

Over the years, Guoga sold slices of iBus Media to the Stars Group, which has owned a majority of the company since at least 2017.

In 2018, several large music publishers sued iBus Media, including Universal Music Group; Roc-A-Fella Records; Capitol Records; and PolyGram. They alleged that podcasts produced by iBus Media had used copyrighted songs without paying for their use.

References

External links
 

Poker publications